Kelloe House was a country house in the former Berwickshire, in the Parish of Edrom, in the Scottish Borders. The house has been demolished. Kelloe Mains and Kelloe Bridge remain.

See also
George Buchan of Kelloe
Kelloe in County Durham
Allanbank
Allanton
List of places in the Scottish Borders
List of places in Scotland

External links
RCAHMS record for Kelloe House
RCAHMS record for Kelloe House, Kelloe Mains, Walled Garden
CANMORE/RCAHMS record of Kelloe Bastle, Dovecot
Archaeology Data Service: A cist from Kelloe Mains, Berwickshire, S P Halliday, J N Graham Ritchie

Houses in the Scottish Borders
Demolished buildings and structures in Scotland